Antonio Riestra, ASC, AČK. (born 1969), is a Mexican-born cinematographer, working in both North America and Europe. He won a Goya Award, and a Gaudí Award for Best Cinematography for his work on Augustí Villaronga's Black Bread (Spain's official entry for the 84th Academy Awards).

Early life 
Riestra was born in Mexico in 1969. He worked as a still photographer for the National Indigenous Institute in Mexico, and later with the Cree and Carrier Nations in British Columbia before moving back to Mexico City and beginning a career in film.

Career 
Riestra began his career in film working as an assistant cameraman with Pierre Beccu French Director/DP on a documentary about Guatemalan refugees going back home after living in Mexico. After this job, he was hired to do the making of documentary of the Swedish film "Pumas daughter" shot in southern Mexico. Riestra climbed the ladder in the film industry on several projects as a focus puller like Rough Magic Directed by Claire Peploe, starring Russell Crow and Bridget Fonda and then on Amores Perros as a camera operator and with Emmanuel Lubezki in commercials. Riestra’s first opportunity to be a cinematographer came on an American commercial shooting in Mexico which later opened the doors to working with the best Mexican commercial directors, and also to shooting 2nd Unit on Frida (2002) alongside Rodrigo Prieto, AMC, ASC. From there Riestra worked as director of photography on several films including: Normal the Düsseldorf Ripper (2009), which earned him a nomination for Best Cinematography at the Czech Lion Awards, Black Bread (2010) for which he won best cinematography at both the Goya Awards and Gaudi Awards, Lidice (2011),  which earned him another nomination for best cinematography at the Czech Lion Awards, Katmandú: A Mirror in the Sky (2011), earning him a nomination for best cinematography at the Gaudi Awards, and Mama (2013), for which he was nominated for Best Cinematography at the Canadian Screen Awards.

Riestra recently worked on the upcoming film Eloise directed by Rob Legato, Stephanie directed Akiva Goldsman. He is a member of the American Society of Cinematographers (ASC), the Czech Assoc. of Cinematographers (AČK), the European Film Academy, the Catalan Film Academy, and IATSE 600.

Filmography (partial)

References

External links
 https://web.archive.org/web/20160117230658/http://antonioriestra.com/bio.html
 
 http://planbfree.com/dop/antonio-riestra/ 
 http://ceskapozice.lidovky.cz/mexican-cameraman-makes-his-mark-on-czech-film-fal-/tema.aspx?c=A110217_174234_pozice_5910&setver=touch
 https://web.archive.org/web/20160304050919/http://silvergrey.tv/talents/antonio-riestra/

Living people
1969 births
Mexican cinematographers